Ivan Ivanovich Loor (born 11 December 1955) is a Russian politician. He is the United Russia member of the State Duma for the Slavgorod constituency.

Ivan Loor was born on 11 December 1955 in Altai Krai to a Russian German family. He worked as agronomist at Plotnikovsky state farm and became its chairman in 1985.

In 1996 Loor elected to the Altai Krai Legislative Assembly. From 1997 he was an advisor to governor Alexander Surikov. From 2008 to 2016 Loor served as chairman of the Altai Krai Legislative Assembly. Since 2016 he represents Slavgorod constituency of Altai Krai in the State Duma of the Russian Federation.

References 

1955 births
Living people
Russian people of German descent
United Russia politicians
People from Altai Krai
Seventh convocation members of the State Duma (Russian Federation)
Eighth convocation members of the State Duma (Russian Federation)